Palmadusta androyensis is a species of sea snail, a cowry, a marine gastropod mollusk in the family Cypraeidae, the cowries.

There are three subspecies : 
Palmadusta androyensis androyensis Blocher & Lorenz, 1999
Palmadusta androyensis consanguinea Blöcher & Lorenz, 2000
Palmadusta androyensis ipacoyana Bozzetti, 2006

Description
The adult shell size varies between 14 mm and 19.4 mm.

Distribution
This species occurs in the Indian Ocean off East Africa and Madagascar.

References

 Blöcher M. & Lorenz F. (1999) A new living species of Cypraeidae from Southern Madagascar (Mollusca: Gastropoda: Cypraeidae). Schriften zur Malakozoologie 13: 13-15.

External links
 
  L. Limpalaër, Trois trésors Malgaches

Cypraeidae
Gastropods described in 1999